Dennis Watkins (born September 9, 1978) is an American magician, mentalist, and actor, based in Chicago, Illinois. Watkins specializes in sleight of hand, walking on broken glass, swallowing razor blades, and a card trick known as the Balloon Trick, where he crawls inside a 7-foot wide balloon. He has performed across the United States, and his public show, The Magic Parlour, has been playing at Chicago's Palmer House Hilton Hotel since New Year's Eve, 2011.

Biography 

Dennis Watkins was born in Dallas, TX.  He is the second in a family of four brothers.  His grandfather, Ed Watkins, was a local magician who worked as the lead demonstrator at a storefront magic shop called Douglas Magicland in Dallas for 30 years.  Around age 7, Watkins began studying sleight-of-hand under the instruction of his grandfather, Ed.

In 2001, Watkins graduated from SMU Meadows School of the Arts in Dallas, TX, where he received the Hunt Leadership Scholars Award. He also spent a year training at the British American Drama Academy.

The House Theatre of Chicago 

Dennis Watkins is a Founding Company Member with The House Theatre of Chicago, where he originated the role of Harry Houdini in Death and Harry Houdini, a play written and directed by Artistic Director Nathan Allen. Portraying Houdini in all 7 sold-out runs of the show, Watkins recreated some of Houdini's feats, including escaping the Water Torture Cell. Watkins received a Joseph Jefferson Award for his work on the show in 2012. Death and Harry Houdini returned to The Adrienne Arsht Center in Miami, Florida in the spring of 2017.

Stage 

As Actor
 2001 - 2017 Death and Harry Houdini
 2002 The Terrible Tragedy of Peter Pan 
 2004 Cave With Man
 2005, 2008 Dave DaVinci Saves the Universe
 2005 The Great and Terrible Wizard of Oz
 2006 Hatfield & McCoy
 2007 The Sparrow
 2007, 2013 The Magnificents

As Playwright
 2007, 2013 The Magnificents
 2011 - 2017 The Magic Parlour

As Magic Designer
 2002 The Terrible Tragedy of Peter Pan
 2005 The Great and Terrible Wizard of Oz
 2007 The Sparrow
 2007 Hope Springs Infernal
 2007, 2013 The Magnificents

As Director
 2004 San Valentino and the Melancholy Kid
 2005 Curse of the Crying Heart
 2006 Valentine Victorious

References

External links 

 
 The House Theatre of Chicago

20th-century American male actors
American magicians
Living people
1978 births